Kim Ji-soo (born January 3, 1995), known mononymously as Jisoo, is a South Korean singer and actress. She is a member of the South Korean girl group Blackpink, formed by YG Entertainment, in August 2016. Outside of her music career, she made her acting debut with a cameo role in the 2015 series The Producers and played her first leading role in the JTBC series Snowdrop (2021–22). She is scheduled to make her solo debut on March 31, 2023.

Life and career

1995–2015: Early life and career beginnings 
Kim Ji-soo was born on January 3, 1995 in Gunpo, Gyeonggi Province, South Korea. She has an older brother and sister. As a child, she played basketball and practiced Taekwondo. She dreamed of becoming a painter and writer. She was a fan of the Korean boy group TVXQ. Jisoo attended high school at the School of Performing Arts Seoul; in 11th grade, she joined a drama club at the school and earned more experience in the entertainment industry by attending auditions. Prior to debuting, Jisoo lived with her parents, siblings and grandparents. In addition to her native Korean, Jisoo has also learned to speak Chinese, Japanese and English.

In 2011, Jisoo joined YG Entertainment as a trainee after passing its auditions. In October 2014, she appeared in Epik High's music video for "Spoiler + Happen Ending" as a heartbroken girl. The same year, she starred in Hi Suhyun's music video for "I'm Different" as Bobby's girlfriend. In 2015, Jisoo made a cameo appearance in the KBS2 drama The Producers with labelmates Sandara Park of 2NE1 and Kang Seung-yoon of Winner.

2016–2022: Debut with Blackpink solo endeavors and acting 

Jisoo debuted as one of the four members of girl group Blackpink on August 8, 2016, alongside Jennie, Rosé and Lisa, with the release of their single album Square One.

From 2017 to 2018, Jisoo joined Inkigayo as a host alongside Got7's Jin-young and NCT's Doyoung. She first ventured into acting in 2019 with a short cameo appearance in the tvN fantasy drama Arthdal Chronicles as Song Joong-ki's love interest. In June 2020, Jisoo's style in the teasers for Blackpink's single "How You Like That" went viral on social media. Celebrities and influencers in South Korea, China, Thailand, and Vietnam replicated her "two-bow hairstyle" and makeup, which Jisoo created herself. Her "dot style", a makeup idea she originated, trended on social media platforms such as Instagram to promote the challenge among overseas fans.

Jisoo took part as writer on the lead single "Lovesick Girls" of Blackpink's first studio album The Album (2020).

Jisoo had her first leading role in 2021 with JTBC series Snowdrop, starring alongside Jung Hae-in. She played a college freshman, Eun Yeong-ro, who is held hostage by her love interest. The show ranked number one on Disney+ in four out of the five countries it was made available in, including South Korea. In September 2022, Jisoo was awarded Outstanding Korean Actress at the Seoul International Drama Awards for her role in Snowdrop. 

Jisoo contributed songwriting credits once again to "Yeah Yeah Yeah", the fourth track from Blackpink's second studio album, Born Pink (2022).

2023–present: Solo debut 
On January 2, 2023, YG Entertainment announced that Jisoo would debut as a solo artist within the year and was in the midst of filming a music video. On March 5, teasers were uploaded to Blackpink’s social media accounts, confirming that her project would be released on March 31, 2023.

Impact and influence 

Jisoo was ranked as the 10th most popular K-pop idol in 2018 and 17th in 2019 in annual surveys conducted by Gallup Korea. In 2019, she was ranked as the sixth most popular female K-pop idol in a survey of soldiers doing mandatory military service in South Korea. During the same year, Jisoo was the only one of two Korean singers added on the BoF 500 list, a "definitive professional index" of people shaping the $2.4 trillion fashion industry. As of February 2021, she is the third most followed K-pop idol on Instagram, along with band member Rosé. 

Jisoo was included in the ranking for the top ten celebrities and influencers leading the world of cosmetics for the first five months of 2020. Women's Wear Daily, a fashion industry trade journal, revealed that Jisoo led the ranking in average engagement per post, followed by Rihanna and Kylie Jenner. She placed 7th in the overall ranking despite having the fewest posts at just 12 in total. Jisoo was the only East Asian on the list.

Jisoo ranked first in the girl group's personal brand reputation list created by Korea Enterprise Research Institute, which analyzed data from brands and online consumers habits to measure those with significant impact on brand consumption and interest. Director of the Korean Language Research Institute Seong-sun Lim noted the Korean wave in the global community was rapidly destroying the conventional Western cultural dominance, naming Jisoo and Jungkook as standards for world beauty over actors Olivia Hussey and James Dean.

In 2020, Dior's increase in sales during the COVID-19 pandemic in South Korea was also attributed to a marketing campaign with Korean pop singers, including Jisoo. She appeared in promotions for Dior's new Bobby bag alongside other prominent influencers such as Chiara Ferragni and Kat Graham. At the brand's Spring/Summer 2021 collection showcase, Jisoo garnered attention as a Korean representative. Her attendance at the showcase earned Dior its highest rated post, with average 33% MIV, since its Fall 2020 show. In March 2021, creative director Maria Grazia Chiuri revealed that Dior's Autumn/Winter 2021 collection was inspired by Jisoo. It was also revealed that one of ten shades of Dior Addict Lip Glow lip balm, #025 Seoul Scarlet, was inspired by Korean women such as Jisoo. 

Her attendance at the Dior Spring/Summer 2022 collection show generated buzz both inside and outside of the Jardin des Tuileries venue. Jisoo became the public figure that generated the most media impact value throughout Paris Fashion Week, with four photos on her personal Instagram valued at $1.84 million. Furthermore, she was the top celebrity for Dior's MIV, making up $15.7 million of the total $39.1 million generated with just two posts. In March, she generated the highest media impact value for a social media post during Dior's Autumn/Winter 2022 fashion show at Paris Fashion Week, with one photo valued at $1.74 million.

In March 2021, the KartRider Rush+ app's ranking increased to 11th place after the announcement of design cooperation with Jisoo. The collaboration she participated in also received a positive response from users.

Philanthropy 
On January 3, 2023, her 28th birthday, Jisoo created her personal YouTube channel named 'Happy Jisoo 103%'. She expressed that the proceeds from her newly-established channel will be donated to charity.

Endorsements and fashion 
Before her debut with Blackpink, Jisoo featured in advertisements for Samsonite, Smart Uniform, LG Electronics, and Nikon. In September 2018, Jisoo and band-mate Rosé became endorsement models for Japanese cosmetics brand Kiss Me. In February 2021, Korean clothing brand It Michaa selected Jisoo as muse for their Spring 2021 collection. She was also appointed for 2021 summer campaign on It Michaa's line, For a Day Michaa. In August 2021, Jisoo was selected as the spokesperson for Korean short brand CELEBe. In March 2022, Jisoo became the brand ambassador for Nexon's game MapleStory, making her the second ambassador after Olympic archer Kim Je-deok.

Dior 

In December 2019, Jisoo became a local ambassador for Dior's cosmetics brand, Dior Beauty. The next summer, Jisoo was recruited to be Dior's muse and modelled for Dior's Fall/Winter 2020 collection. In September 2020, Jisoo covered the 155th edition 2020 of Dazed Korea, where she discussed her work with Dior. In December 2020, Jisoo was photographed with the Lady Dior and D'Lite bags in Dior's Cruise 2020–2021 Collection.

In January 2021, Dior Beauty's "Dior Forever Skin Glow Cushion", endorsed by Jisoo, was released exclusively in Korea. She also promoted the brand's Spring/Summer Collection, wearing Dior's Caro bag. The next March, Jisoo cemented her long-term partnership with Dior when they announced her as their new global ambassador, alongside Natalie Portman and Cara Delevingne. In May 2021, Jisoo embarked on her first collaboration project with the brand, fronting the Dior Fall '21 and Dior Vespa campaigns as Elle magazine's June cover star, which hit shelves in four countries—Hong Kong, Thailand, Singapore and India. Jisoo modeled Dior's newly launched lip balm, Dior Addict Lip Glow, for the Dior Beauty series. 

In June 2021, Jisoo attended the Dior Resort 2022 show at Greece's Panathenaic Stadium, wearing all-white linen dress by creative director Maria Grazia Chiuri. In September 2021, Jisoo attended Dior's Womenswear Spring/Summer 2022 show,  held during the 2021 Paris Fashion Week at Jardin des Tuileries. She sat in the front row, next to the chairman and CEO of Dior, Pietro Beccari. Ahead of the show, her journey to Paris was documented on Dior's social media accounts, showcasing moments ranging from her visit to the house's ateliers and the inspiration behind the Spring/Summer 2022 collection and to the archives of Lady Dior, named after Princess Diana.

In February 2022, Jisoo became the face of Dior's Addict lipstick collection along with fellow ambassadors Anya Taylor-Joy and Sharon Alexie. In honor of her 28th birthday, Dior released a new shade of lipgloss, "031 Strawberry."

Cartier
In September 2020, Jisoo was appointed as the main model of Cartier's Pasha de Cartier. On May 25, 2022, Cartier announced Jisoo as their brand ambassador joining the Panthère de Cartier community which includes Annabelle Wallis, Ella Balinska, Chang Chen, Mariacarla Boscono and Yasmine Sabri.

Collaborations
In February 2021, Line Friends announced Jisoo as their exclusive partner to design a character in mobile game KartRider Rush+, which would be released on March 19, 2021. She personally sketched items and idea of the character herself. Her items included Chichi, a rabbit inspired by Jisoo's nickname "Turtle Rabbit Kim" among fans, and Dalgom, also the name of her pet. Both Chichi and Dalgom were developed into stickers on the platform Line Messenger.

Discography

Single albums

Singles

Songwriting credits 
All song credits are adapted from the Korea Music Copyright Association's database, unless otherwise noted.

Filmography

Television series

Hosting

Music videos

Awards and nominations

Notes

References

External links 

 
 

1995 births
Living people
People from Gunpo
21st-century South Korean actresses
21st-century South Korean women singers
Blackpink members
K-pop singers
South Korean female idols
South Korean female models
South Korean women pop singers
South Korean dance musicians
South Korean mezzo-sopranos
South Korean television actresses
South Korean television presenters
South Korean women television presenters
YG Entertainment artists
Dance-pop musicians
Japanese-language singers of South Korea